Helen Kerly or Ruth Helen Clark (6 January 1916 - 26 May 1992) was a British civilian female pilot officer who was one of only two such women commended for their work.

Life
Third Officer Ruth Helen Kerly was born in 1916 in London and she came to notice as an officer who delivered Spitfires during the Second World War. 

Women were not permitted to be fighter pilots during the war, but they were allowed to deliver aircraft to replace those lost during either training or combat missions. Kerly had been photographed as a member of the Royal Aero Club in 1938, but although the ATA were desperate for pilots she was the 130th employed in 1943. 

Kerly was one of only two women to be commended as pilots during the war. Her commendation was given for landing a Spitfire that had technical difficulties in a small field on 25 June 1944. She was in the Air Transport Auxiliary and it was her job to deliver aircraft from various factories including the Castle Bromwich Aircraft Factory which was one of the main factories for assembling the aircraft. She would deliver the aircraft to airfields around Britain. She left the ATA in September 1945 and in 1947, she married Storm Clark.

Legacy

When she died on 26 May 1992 she left her leather flying helmet and goggles to a fellow pilot, Alec Matthews. He in turn donated their joint memorabilia to Thinktank, Birmingham Science Museum. The helmet and goggles are now on display in the Spitfire Gallery which opened in 2015.

References

External links

1916 births
1992 deaths
British women in World War II
English aviators
Air Transport Auxiliary pilots
People from London
British women aviators